Villaviciosa de al lado is a 2016 Spanish comedy film written and directed by Nacho G. Velilla and starring a coral cast including Carmen Machi, Arturo Valls, Belén Cuesta and Macarena García.

Plot
Luck seems to be smiling to the town of Villaviciosa de al Lado, as many people in the town have won a lottery prize. The happiness doesn't last, though, as the men bought the winning ticket at the local brothel, and can't cash it in because their wives would discover they have been there. Things take another turn for the worse when the local spa is forcefully closed due to some bad managing decisions from Anselmo, the town mayor, and many people start leaving Villaviciosa.

Cast

References

External links
 

Spanish comedy films
2010s Spanish films
2010s Spanish-language films